Jetts Fitness is an Australia-based chain of fitness centers. It was the first gym to market with 24/7 access, no lock in contracts, low fees and member-friendly policies. In addition to successfully navigating the business through the pandemic, it was awarded the 13th Best Place to Work in Australia in 2021 and 7th in 2022.

History 
Jetts was founded in Australia in 2007 by husband-and-wife team Brendon and Cristy Levenson, with the first club opening on the Gold Coast, Queensland.

It was the first gym brand in Australia to offer 24/7 access, no lock-in contracts, low fees and member-friendly policies – an approach that made health and fitness available to more people than ever before. In 2012, the company was named by BRW as Australia's #1 Fastest Growing Franchise, with revenue growth of 403% and turnover of $43 million, and in 2012 was the 2nd fastest growing company in Australia.

In 2016, the company was acquired by Quadrant Private Equity, who own the company through its Fitness and Lifestyle Group along with other Australian-based gym brands including Fitness First, Goodlife Health Clubs and Hypoxi.

In 2022, following a strategic review of its operations, Fitness & Lifestyle Group (FLG) sold via Management Buy Out led by Jetts Fitness Australia CEO Elaine Jobson that encompasses 129 franchised clubs in Australia as well as international franchise businesses in the UK and the Netherlands. 

Fitness & Lifestyle Group retains full ownership of its Jetts Fitness brand and operations in New Zealand, Vietnam and Thailand, where the brand is already market leader by number of clubs.

International expansion 
In June 2010, the franchise launched its first international club in Royal Oak, New Zealand. In late 2013, the first European club opened in the Netherlands, and the company announced further expansion plans into the UK in October 2014.

In January 2016, the company opened its first Asian club in Bangkok, Thailand. In 2021, there are at least 33 clubs in Thailand.

In 2015, Jetts was named best medium-sized fitness company at the New Zealand Exercise Industry Awards. That year the group operated about 250 clubs, comprising more than 250,000 members.

The head office is located on the Sunshine Coast, Queensland.

See also
Australian Institute of Personal Trainers

References

External links

Fitness and health

Health clubs in Australia
Health care companies of New Zealand
Health care companies established in 2007
2007 establishments in Australia
Companies based on the Gold Coast, Queensland